Lovat Dickson, born Horatio Henry Lovat Dickson (June 30, 1902 – January 2, 1987), was a notable publisher and writer, the first Canadian to have a major publishing role in Britain. He is best known today for his biographies of Grey Owl, Richard Hillary, Radclyffe Hall and H. G. Wells. He also wrote a history of the Royal Ontario Museum.

Biography
Lovat Dickson was born in Victoria, Australia to parents of United Empire Loyalist descent. His father was a mining engineer. At the age of seven, he moved with his family to Rhodesia (now Zimbabwe), and at eleven he was sent to school in England. At age fifteen, he moved to Canada, where he worked in a mining camp near Jasper, Alberta. A precocious entrepreneur, he founded and edited the Blue Diamond Mine newsletter while in Jasper. He began studies at the University of Alberta (U of A) in 1923, graduating in 1927 with first class honours in English and earning the Lieutenant Governor’s Gold Medal and a Royal Society of Canada Fellowship in English literature. He earned a Master of Arts degree from the U of A in 1929, but by this time he had already returned to England, where he embarked on a successful career as an editor and publisher. He was first assistant editor of the Fortnightly Review, and later the editor of the Review of Reviews. He started his own publishing company in 1932, called Lovat Dickson Limited, later forming a publishing partnership with Piers Gilchrist Thompson. He also founded the short-lived Lovat Dickson’s Magazine (20 issues, November 1933 to June 1935) in which he published short stories by such writers as Walter de la Mare, H. E. Bates, Fritiof Nilsson, V. S. Pritchett, and D. H. Lawrence.

One of his principal successes as a publisher was Pilgrims of the Wild by Grey Owl, whom Dickson made a celebrity in England by taking him on two highly successful promotional tours in the late 1930s. Grey Owl and Dickson became friends and Dickson wrote two biographies of the enigmatic Englishman that appeared in 1939 and 1973.

In 1938, Dickson sold his catalogue to the publisher Peter Llewelyn Davies and joined the staff of Macmillan & Company in London. In 1940 he became a director and the following year, 1941, he was appointed the company’s general manager, a position he held until his retirement in 1964.

He was married to Marguerite Brodie of Montreal. He died in Toronto at 84.

Bibliography
 Out of the West Land (1934)
 The Green leaf : a tribute to Grey Owl (editor, 1938)
 Half Breed (1939), biography of Grey Owl
 Out of the West Land (1944)
 Richard Hillary (1950)
 The Ante-Room (1959)
 The House of Words (1963)
 H.G. Wells: His Turbulent Life and Times (1969; reprinted in 1971)
 Wilderness Man: The Strange Story of Grey Owl (1973)
 Radclyffe Hall and the Well of Loneliness: A Sapphic Chronicle (1975)
 The Museum Makers: The Story of the Royal Ontario Museum (1986)

References

External links
 Lovat Dickson Fonds, Library and Archives Canada

Canadian publishers (people)
20th-century Canadian historians
Canadian male non-fiction writers
Canadian biographers
Male biographers
1902 births
1987 deaths
People from Jasper, Alberta
20th-century biographers
20th-century male writers